Interreg is a series of programmes to stimulate cooperation between regions in and out of the European Union (EU), funded by the European Regional Development Fund. The first Interreg started in 1989. Interreg IV covered the period 2007–2013. Interreg V (2014–2020) covers all 27 EU member states, the EFTA countries (Norway, Switzerland, Iceland, Liechtenstein), six accession countries and 18 neighbouring countries. It has a budget of EUR 10.1 billion, which represents 2.8% of the total of the European Cohesion Policy budget. Since the non EU countries don't pay EU membership fee, they contribute directly to Interreg, not through ERDF.

Aims of the programme
Interreg is designed to stimulate cooperation between member states of the European Union on different levels. One of its main targets is to diminish the influence of national borders in favor of equal economic, social and cultural development of the whole territory of the European Union.

The Interreg goal is designed to strengthen economic, social and territorial cohesion throughout Europe, by fostering the balanced development of the continent through cross-border, transnational and inter-regional cooperation. Special emphasis has been placed on integrating remote regions with those that share external borders with the candidate countries.

Organization
Interreg was launched as Interreg I for the programming period 1989–1993 (budget EUR 1.1 billion), and continued as Interreg II for the subsequent period 1994–1999. It moved on to Interreg III for the period 2000–2006. Projects from that closed by the end of 2008. Interreg IV was covering 2007–2013. Interreg V is currently operational, from 2014 until 2020.

Interreg differs from the majority of Cohesion Policy programmes in one important respect: it involves a collaboration among authorities of two or more Member States. Interreg measures are not only required to demonstrate a positive impact on the development on either side of the border but their design and, possibly, their implementation must be carried out on a common cross-border basis.

Once the Operational Programmes have been approved by the European Commission, the implementation of the programmes is co-ordinated by steering committees, which consist of representatives of the authorities responsible for Cohesion Policy measures in each member state. These can be both central state agencies and regional agencies. Like almost all Cohesion Policy measures, Interreg projects require co-funding to be provided by Member States, regional authorities or the project leaders themselves. The amount of co-funding required differs by region, ranging from 50% down to 0% in the poorest regions.

The final beneficiaries of Interreg funds are usually public authorities, interest associations and non-profit organisations, such as chambers of commerce, employer organisations, unions or research institutes. Under Interreg IV, private firms are only eligible if they apply through a consortium of several firms; in previous programme periods, they were not eligible at all.

Strands
Interreg is made up of three strands: Interreg A, Interreg B and Interreg C. They are described in more detail below.

Strand A: cross-border cooperation
Cross-border cooperation between adjacent regions aims to develop cross-border social and economic centres through common development strategies. The term cross-border region is often used to refer to the resulting entities, provided there is some degree of local activity involved. The term Euroregion is also used to refer to the various types of entities that are used to administer Interreg funds. In many cases, they have established secretariats that are funded via technical assistance: the Interred funding component aimed at establishing an international presence for local Interreg deployment. Interreg A is by far the largest strand in terms of budget and number of programmes.

Strand B: transnational cooperation
Transnational cooperation involving national, regional and local authorities aim to promote better integration within the Union through the formation of large groups of European regions. Strand B is the intermediate level, where generally non-contiguous regions from several different countries cooperate because they experience joint or comparable problems. There are 13 Interreg IVB programmes.

Strand C: interregional cooperation
Interregional cooperation aims to improve the effectiveness of regional development policies and instruments through large-scale information exchange and sharing of experience (networks). This is financially the smallest strand of the three, but the programmes cover all EU Member States.

Interreg III

Strand A: cross-border cooperation
Priorities for action in strand IIIA were:
Promotion of urban, rural and coastal development
Strengthening the spirit of enterprise
Developing small and medium-sized enterprises, including those in the tourism sector
Developing local employment initiatives
Assistance for labour market integration and social inclusion
Initiatives for encouraging shared use of human resources, and facilities for research and development, education, culture, communication, health and civil protection
Measures for environmental protection, improving energy efficiency and renewable energy sources
Improving transport, information and communication networks and services, water and energy systems
Increasing cooperation in legal and administrative areas
Increasing human and institutional potential for cross-border cooperation

Examples of Interreg IIIA programmes
Alcotra, a French-Italian cross-border programme in the Alps
Italia-Malta, an Italian-Maltese programme

Strand B: transnational cooperation
Proposals for transnational cooperation under IIIB had to take account of:
Experience from previous Interreg programmes;
Priorities for Community policies, especially trans-European transport networks;
Recommendations made in the European Spatial Development Plan (ESDP).

Within this context, the priorities for action whereas follows:
Drawing up regional development strategies at transnational level, including cooperation between towns or urban areas and rural areas
Promoting effective and sustainable transport systems, together with better access to the information society. The aim here is to facilitate communication between island or peripheral regions.
Promoting protection of the environment and natural resources, particularly water resources.

In the specific case of ultra-peripheral regions, transnational cooperation encourages the following initiatives:
Economic integration and improved cooperation between these regions and regions in other Member States
Improved links with the countries of their wider geographic area (Caribbean, Latin America, Atlantic Ocean, North West Africa and the Indian Ocean)

Examples of Interreg IIIB projects
HST Connect, an INTERREG IIIB North West Europe Programme project on high speed train connections
The European Garden Heritage Network
Check the keep.eu database for more Interreg IIIB projects

Strand C: interregional cooperation
Interreg IIIC promoted interregional co-operation between regional and other public authorities across the entire EU territory and neighbouring countries. It allowed regions without joint borders to work together in common projects and develop networks of co-operation.

Co-operation under Interreg IIIC gave access to experience of other actors involved in regional development policy and created synergies between "best practice" projects and the Structural Fund's mainstream programmes. The overall aim was to improve the effectiveness of regional development policies and instruments through large-scale information exchange and sharing of experience (networks) in a structured way.

Priorities for action included research, technology development, enterprise, the information society, tourism, culture, and the environment.

Examples of Interreg IIIC projects
Interregional Co-operation on Biomass Utilization, aiming to establish an interregional network of actors in the field of biomass utilization
Adriatic Action Plan 2020, on sustainable development
Connected Cities, on sustainable mobility and spatial development
TranSUrban, on urban regeneration and public transport
Urbike, on cycling in cities
Wireless cities, which aims to increase ICT usage in some cities
Check the keep.eu database for more Interreg IIIC projects

Interreg IV
Interreg IV has a budget of almost 7,8 billion euro (2006 prices), up from 4,9 billion euro in Interreg III (1999 prices).

Strand A: cross-border cooperation
The A strand of Interreg IV covers 52 programmes, which use up to 74% of all resources (some 5,6 billion euros).

Examples of Interreg IVA projects
FLUXPYR (2009–2012) (www.fluxpyr.eu): European cross-border network for the determination and management of water, carbon and energy fluxes and stocks in agricultural and grassland ecosystems of the Pyrenees, in the context of climate and land-use change. 11 partners from France, Spain and Andorra. Cofinanced by the EU-ERDF, Generalitat de Catalunya and Conseil Régional Midi-Pyrénées.
ISLES project – "ISLES", accelerating the development of renewable energy off the coasts of Scotland and Ireland
WINSENT project: WINSENT is an ambitious project to promote social entrepreneurship in Ireland and North Wales.
WINSENT provides a networking opportunity and free assistance, guidance and a range of supports to any social entrepreneur or social enterprise based in Dublin and surrounds in Ireland or based in North Wales in the counties of Denbighshire and the Isle of Anglesey, including opportunities to network with other like minded "change agents" through the WINSENT Networks: socialenterprise.ie and WISEA
SHAPING 24 - SHAPING 24 is a cultural and heritage tourism initiative that links 12 heritage sites in Norwich with 12 heritage sites in Ghent, increasing awareness of the longstanding historical links between East Anglia and the Low Countries. SHAPING 24 seeks to promote and support the 24 sites, raise the profile of Norwich and Ghent as significant cultural heritage cities. It is funded through the Interreg IVA 2 Seas Programme .
AI-CHEM CHANNEL - AI-Chem Channel project gathers 9 Research organisations and institutes on both sides of the Channel and aims at developing cross-border relationships between academic and industrials stakeholders from the molecular chemistry sector. It is supported by local innovation agencies, incubators and CBS technopole. It has a budget of 7.6M€ among which 3.8M€ are ERDF European Fund in the framework of the INTERREG IVa France(Channel)-England programme.
Check the keep.eu database for more Interreg IVA projects

Strand B: transnational cooperation
Interreg IVb is divided into thirteen different Operational Programmes (OPs). Each OP is led by a Secretariat and covers a specific part of the EU territory. All Member States can participate in Interreg IVB, but only if an organisation or authority is located in the eligible area of one of the programmes (Annex 1). IVB has a total budget of 1,82 billion euro for the programme period 2007–2013.

List of the Interreg IVb programmes:
Alpine Space programme
Atlantic Area programme
Baltic Sea programme
Caribbean Area programme
Central Europe programme
Indian Ocean Area programme
MAC programme - Açores-Madeira-Canarias
Mediterranean programme
North Sea Region programme
North West Europe programme
Northern Periphery programme
South East Europe programme
South West Europe programme

Examples of Interreg IVB projects
ALFA (Adaptive Land use for Flood Alleviation) aims to protect the North West Europe region against the effects of flooding due to climate changes. This will be done in the project by creating new capacity for storage or discharge of peak floods within river catchments.
BLAST (Bringing Land and Sea Together) is a collaborative project of public, private and academic partners from seven North Sea countries, which is developing prototype tools for better data integration, coastal zone management and navigation in the North Sea.
MP4: 'Making Places Profitable, Public and Private Open Spaces' is a transnational project involving partners from seven countries in the North Sea Region focusing on innovative approaches to 'place-keeping' – the long-term management of private and public open spaces. Funded by the North Sea Region Programme.
'Collabor8.me', a transnational programme involving nine partners in five different North West European countries that aims to contribute to the economic prosperity, sustainability and cultural identity of North West Europe in increasingly global markets.
Rural Alliances, aiming to bring communities and businesses together to promote rural 'vibrancy'.
SmartCities, creating an innovation network between 8 municipal governments and 4+ academic partners in six countries, leading to excellence in the domain of the development and take-up of e-services. Funded by the North Sea Region Programme.
SoNorA, on improving transport infrastructure and services between the Adriatic and the Baltic Sea.
Technet_nano, is a transnational network of public clean rooms and research facilities in micro- and nanotechnology making accessible innovation resources and services to SMEs in the Baltic Sea Region.
The MUSIC Project (Mitigation in Urban areas: Solutions for Innovative Cities), is a transnational cooperation project between European cities and research institutes in Northwest Europe. MUSIC aims to reduce CO2 emissions by 50% in the partner cities Aberdeen, Montreuil, Gent, Ludwigsburg and Rotterdam in 2030. The Dutch Research Institute For Transitions (DRIFT) and Public Research Centre Henri Tudor from Luxembourg assist the cities with scientific expertise in Transition Management and Geospatial Decision Support Systems.
Check the keep.eu database for more Interreg IVB projects

Strand C: interregional cooperation
Strand C covers the interregional co-operation programme (INTERREG IVC) and 3 networking programmes (URBACT II, INTERACT II and ESPON). Each programme covers all 27 Member States of the EU. ESPON (European Spatial Planning Observation Network) covers 31 states; Liechtenstein, Norway, Iceland and Switzerland are included as well. They provide a framework for exchanging experience between regional and local bodies in different countries. Strand C has an ERDF contribution of 445 million euros. The non-EU countries contribute fully their shares to these programs.

Examples of Interreg IVC projects
Regioclima, on adaptation to the new climate conditions
Pre-waste, on waste prevention in cities and regions
Osepa, on usage of open-source software in public administrations
TR3S, on smart specialization and innovation
Check the keep.eu database for more Interreg IVC projects

See also
ESPRID
European Grouping of Territorial Cooperation
European Spatial Development Perspective

References

External links
Interreg.eu - All Interreg programmes search tool
keep.eu, resource tool of projects and partners of Interreg since 2000
Interreg IVA (cross-border co-operation programmes
Official Interreg IVC website
Interreg.co.uk (Information Portal on Interreg Programmes eligible to UK applicants)

Regional policies of the European Union

br:Politikerezh rannvro Unaniezh Europa